St. Xavier's College, Burdwan, West Bengal, India, is a graduate and undergraduate college opened in 2014 by the Calcutta Province of the Society of Jesus, the body which also administers St. Xavier's College, Kolkata and other institutes throughout India and abroad.

History 
Purba Bardhaman (i.e. The Jesuit roots of Bardhaman ("Burdwan") go back to the 1960s, when they opened an English medium school for the large Santhal Christian population.

Xavier's Burdwan was opened in July 2014 with Bishop Cyperian Monis of the Diocese of Asansol officiating.

The college is affiliated to The University of Burdwan. It offers all 3 years honors courses: the B.A. in English, Sociology, and Geography; the B.Com. in Accountancy; and the B.Sc. in Biotechnology, Computer Science, and Geography.

From 2018, as per notification from The University of Burdwan, it is also now offering BCA(Bachelor of Computer Applications)[3 years] course.

See also
 List of institutions of higher education in West Bengal
 Education in West Bengal
 List of Jesuit sites

References

External links

Colleges in India
Jesuit universities and colleges in India
Universities and colleges in Purba Bardhaman district
University of Burdwan affiliates
Educational institutions established in 2014
2014 establishments in West Bengal